Mentone railway station is located on the Frankston line in Victoria, Australia. It serves the south-eastern Melbourne suburb of Mentone, and it opened on 19 December 1881 as Balcombe Road. It was renamed Balcombe on 1 September 1882, and was renamed Mentone on 7 January 1884.

It is classed as a Premium Station, and it is listed on the Victorian Heritage Register.

History

Mentone station opened on 1 September 1882, when the railway line from Caulfield was extended to Mordialloc. Like the suburb itself, the station is named after the French Riviera resort Menton.

Until the 1940s, a former siding at the station existed, operating across Station Street to a timber yard.

In 1959, boom barriers replaced interlocked gates at the former Balcombe Road level crossing, which was located at the Up end of the station.

In 1981, the goods yard was closed to traffic. In late 1984/early 1985, a number of sidings and a headshunt at the station were abolished. Also in 1985, the signal box and interlocking were abolished.

In December 2007, Mentone was upgraded to a Premium Station.

On 20 March 2020, the station was closed from 8.15pm to allow for works to remove the three level crossings at Balcombe, Charman and Park Roads, and to build a new Mentone station. On 20 July of that year, the rebuilt station opened. The former heritage station buildings were retained as part of the project.

Platforms and services

Mentone has two side platforms. It is serviced by Metro Trains' Frankston line services.

Platform 1:
  all stations and limited express services to Flinders Street, Werribee and Williamstown

Platform 2:
  all stations services to Frankston

Transport links

Kinetic Melbourne operates one SmartBus route via Mentone station, under contract to Public Transport Victoria:
  : Altona station – Mordialloc

Ventura Bus Lines operates four routes via Mentone station, under contract to Public Transport Victoria:
 : Hampton station – Carrum station
 : Dandenong station – Brighton
 : Dandenong station – Brighton
 : Moorabbin station – Westfield Southland

Gallery

References

External links
 Melway map

Listed railway stations in Australia
Premium Melbourne railway stations
Railway stations in Melbourne
Railway stations in Australia opened in 1881
Heritage-listed buildings in Melbourne
Railway stations in the City of Kingston (Victoria)